Daniel Koch (December 24, 1816 - January 7, 1903) was an American politician. A member of the Pennsylvania House of Representatives, he was elected in 1860. He was the father of railroad magnate Richard H. Koch and served as a Union soldier in the Civil War.

Biography

Family
Daniel Koch was born as the first of ten children to Henry Koch and Susanna Bock Koch on December 24, 1816. He was born at the mill that his ancestors built, called Kunkle's Mill. Susanna was the daughter of Balthaser Bock, an emigrant from Prussia. Koch was also ethnically Germanic, as his ancestor Adam Koch arrived from Germany on May 30, 1741. Adam had settled in Whitehall Township, Lehigh County, Pennsylvania.

Daniel Koch's siblings were: Hugh, Henry, William and Charles (twins), Mary (who married Eli Miller), Catherine (who married William Shuman), Sarah (who married Charles T. Bowen of Pottsville), and Amanda (who married Jacob H. Pyle).

On October 24, 1839 Daniel married Miss Mary Ann Beck who was "from an old and prominent family in Pennsylvania." She was born on January 24, 1818, and died August 26, 1888. Together Koch and Mary had eleven children, being: Harriet (who married B. F. Jacobs), Francis Daniel, Allen, Jeremiah, Albert B., Sarah Maria (who married Dr. Lentz of Fleetwood), Richard Henry, Emanuel, Arenius Glen, Catherine "Kate" Mary (who married Oscar B. Mellott), and Ambrose Ellsworth. All but Albert B. lived to maturity, who died at the age of six.

Business
After his marriage to Mary, the family moved to Middleport, where Daniel joined in the mercantile business. In 1857 they moved again, and this time he began farming. Daniel's father Henry had been a successful farmer, merchant and miller. Daniel continued in that tradition and ended up owning the Koch Homestead, which comprised 143 acres. Of those, over 100 were cultivated.

In 1866, the family moved again, this time to Monocacy in Berks County. There, Koch purchased and managed a flour mill. He purchased a second mill in the town of Fleetwood, which he operated until his retirement in 1882.

Politics
Koch was considered "an influential man in politics." He stumped the county with a number of influential men, including Anson Burlingame, Governor Andrew Gregg Curtin, George Francis Train, and others. He was nominated and elected to the Pennsylvania House of Representatives in 1860, as a Republican, where he was considered "a very popular public speaker and valued member of his party."

In 1863 when Pennsylvania was invaded by General Robert E. Lee of the Confederate Army during the Civil War, Daniel and his third son Jeremiah served in protecting the state. Both joined Company E, Twenty-Seventh Pennsylvania Infantry. Daniel's oldest son Francis served for three years in the Union Army against the South as a company commander, gaining the rank of captain. Daniel's brothers Hugh, Henry, William and Charles also served in the Union army as well.

References

Union Army soldiers
1816 births
1903 deaths
Businesspeople from Pennsylvania
Farmers from Pennsylvania
People from Schuylkill County, Pennsylvania
People of Pennsylvania in the American Civil War
Republican Party members of the Pennsylvania House of Representatives
19th-century American politicians